Saratoga County is a county in the U.S. state of New York, and is the fastest-growing county in Upstate New York. As of the 2020 U.S. census, the county's population was enumerated at 235,509, representing a 7.2% increase from the 2010 population of 219,607, representing one of the fastest growth rates in the northeastern United States. The county seat is Ballston Spa. Saratoga County is included in the Capital District, encompassing the Albany-Schenectady-Troy, New York Metropolitan Statistical Area.

Saratoga County's name was derived from the Iroquois word sah-rah-ka or sarach-togue, meaning "the hill beside the river", referring to the Hudson River bordering the county on its eastern flank and the Mohawk River delineating its southern border. Saratoga County, bisected by the toll-free, six-lane Adirondack Northway, serves as an outdoor recreational haven and as the gateway to the Adirondack Mountains and State Park for the populations of the Albany and New York City metropolitan areas. The county is also home to the internationally renowned Saratoga Race Course, one of the oldest venues in horse racing.

Saratoga County lies at the heart of eastern New York State's recognized Tech Valley, a growing center for the computer hardware side of the high-technology industry and its concomitant venture capital investment, with great strides in the nanotechnology sector, digital electronics design, and water- and electricity-dependent integrated microchip circuit manufacturing, involving companies including IBM, GlobalFoundries, Samsung, and Taiwan Semiconductor, among others. In April 2021, GlobalFoundries, a company specializing in the semiconductor industry, moved its headquarters from Silicon Valley, California to its most advanced semiconductor-chip manufacturing facility in Saratoga County near a section of the Adirondack Northway, in Malta, New York. Saratoga County is also frequently recognized for its high standard of living and quality of life.

History

When counties were established in the Province of New York in 1683, the present Saratoga County was part of Albany County. This was an enormous county, including the northern part of New York, as well as all of the present state of Vermont and, in theory, extending westward to the Pacific Ocean. This large county was progressively reduced in size by the separation of several counties until 1791, when Saratoga County and Rensselaer County were split off from Albany County. The Battles of Saratoga (September 19 and October 7, 1777) marked the climax of the Saratoga campaign, giving a decisive victory to the Americans over the British in the American Revolutionary War, which convinced France that the Thirteen Colonies could win the war. The government of Louis XVI began lending military and financial aid to the American Patriot cause.

During the 19th century, Saratoga County was an important industrial center. Its location 30 miles north of Albany on the Delaware and Hudson Railway, as well as its proximity to water power from the Hudson River and the Kayaderosseras Creek, led to rapid industrial development beginning in the early 19th century. Some of the most important industrial employers were paper mills, tanneries, foundries, and textile mills.

Since the construction of the Adirondack Northway in the 1960s, Saratoga County has consistently been the fastest-growing county in the Capital District and indeed, in Upstate New York, and one of the fastest-growing in the Northeastern United States. The county has historically maintained a low county tax rate; according to its official website, Saratoga County levies one of the lowest county tax rates in New York.

Geography
Saratoga County is situated in the eastern portion of New York State, north of the state capital city of Albany, northwest of Troy, and east of Utica. The Hudson River forms the eastern border of the county, while the Mohawk River demarcates its southern border. The highest elevation in Saratoga County is at the peak of Tennet Mountain in the Adirondack Mountains, at 2,759 ft (841 m), while the lowest elevation is 69 ft (21 m), at the waterfront of the Village of Waterford, at the confluence of the Mohawk and Hudson Rivers.

Adjacent counties
Saratoga County is bordered by eight counties. Listed clockwise, they are:
 Warren County - north
 Washington County - east
 Rensselaer County - southeast
 Albany County - south
 Schenectady County - southwest
 Montgomery County - southwest
 Fulton County - west
 Hamilton County - northwest

Demographics

2020 Census
In 1960, Saratoga County had a population of only 89,000, less than half of its population noted at the 2020 United States Census, enumerated at 235,509.

2010 Census
As of the 2010 U.S. Census, there were 219,607 people, 88,296 households, and 58,814 families residing in Saratoga County.  The population density was 271 people per square mile (105/km2).  There were 98,656 housing units at an average density of 122 per square mile (41/km2).  The racial makeup of the county was 94.3% White, 1.8% Asian, 1.5% Black or African American, 0.2% Native American, 0.0% Pacific Islander, 0.5% from other races, and 1.7% from two or more races.  2.4% of the population were Hispanic or Latino of any race.

There were 88,296 households, out of which 29.5% had children under the age of 18 living with them, 53.3% were married couples living together, 9.1% had a female householder with no husband present, and 33.4% were non-families. 26.1% of all households were made up of individuals, 31.5% of households had individuals under 18 years, and 9.5% had someone living alone who was 65 years of age or older.  The average household size was 2.44 and the average family size was 2.96.

Of Saratoga County's population in 2010, 6.3% were between ages of 5 and 9 years, 6.7% between 10 and 14 years, 6.5% between 15 and 19 years, 5.5% between 20 and 24 years, 5.5% between 25 and 29 years, 5.8% between 30 and 34 years, 6.6% between 35 and 39 years, 7.9% between 40 and 44 years, 8.5% between 45 and 49 years, 8.0% between 50 and 54 years, 7.0% between 55 and 59 years, 6.4% between 60 and 64 years, and 13.7% of age 65 years and over. 22.7% of the county's population was under age 18. The median age was 40.9 years.

According to the 2009-2013 American Community Survey, the median income for a household in Saratoga County was $69,826, and the median income for a family was $87,058. Males had a median income of $59,636 versus $44,743 for females. The per capita income for the county was $35,176.  About 4.0% of families and 6.5% of the population were below the poverty line, including 7.4% of those under age 18 and 6.1% of those age 65 or over.

Transportation

Adirondack Northway
The toll-free, six-lane Adirondack Northway bisects Saratoga County, running in a south–north direction. This highway, designated Interstate 87, is the primary conduit connecting the capital of New York, Albany, northward across the Thaddeus Kosciusko Bridge into and through Saratoga County, then past Lake George in the Adirondack Park, through the Adirondack Mountains, and eventually to the Canada–United States border, where it continues seamlessly as Quebec Autoroute 15 to Montreal. This freeway has been a major catalyst for the growth of population and commerce in Saratoga County.

Rail
The Saratoga and North Creek Railway was a heritage railway that operated from 2011 to 2018 between the Saratoga Springs Amtrak station at its southern terminus and North Creek in the Adirondack Park at its northern terminus. Its commercial operations were originally built by the Adirondack Railway (succeeded by the Delaware and Hudson). Amtrak's Ethan Allen Express and Adirondack services remain at Saratoga Springs.

Airports
These public-use airports are located in Saratoga County:
 Saratoga County Airport (5B2) – Saratoga Springs
 Garnseys Airport (B04) – Schuylerville
 Heber Airpark (K30) – Gansevoort
 Plateau Sky Ranch Airport (1F2) – Edinburg
 Round Lake Airport (W57) – Round Lake

Economy

Tech Valley

Since the 2000s, the economy of Saratoga County and the surrounding Capital District has been redirected toward high technology. Tech Valley is a marketing name for the eastern part of New York, encompassing Saratoga County, the Capital District, and the Hudson Valley. Originated in 1998 to promote the greater Albany area as a high-tech competitor to regions such as Silicon Valley and Boston, it has since grown to represent the counties in the Capital District and extending to IBM's Westchester County plants in the south and the Canada–US border to the north. The area's high-technology ecosystem is supported by technologically focused academic institutions including Rensselaer Polytechnic Institute and the State University of New York Polytechnic Institute. Tech Valley encompasses 19 counties straddling both sides of the Adirondack Northway and the New York Thruway, and with heavy state taxpayer subsidy, has experienced significant growth in the computer hardware side of the high-technology industry, with great strides in the nanotechnology sector, digital electronics design, and water- and electricity-dependent integrated microchip circuit manufacturing, involving companies including GlobalFoundries in Malta and others.

Adirondack Trust Company is the largest independent community bank in Saratoga County.  Adirondack Trust's 167 full-time employees own the company, which offers banking, loans and investment services, along with insurance through its Amsure subsidiary.  As of December 2020, the bank reported almost $1.5 billion in assets, and over $1.3 billion in deposits, across 13 branches.

Recreation

Saratoga County is extremely popular between late July and early September each year due to the Saratoga Race Course being open. This world-famous track dates back to 1863, when it was founded by John Morrissey. Thoroughbred horse racing in the United States has its own Hall of Fame in Saratoga Springs, which honors remarkable horses, jockeys, owners, and trainers. Horse-racing fans come from all over to watch the races.

The Saratoga National Historical Park is located along the Hudson River in Stillwater, and features a drive-around trail where one can drive up to each station. The park is also famous for its outstanding views of the area's natural scenery and Vermont's Green Mountains in the distance.

The Saratoga Spa State Park capitalizes on the culture and the mineral springs that once drove Saratoga County. This is a large state park and includes a hotel, two pool complexes, mineral baths, Saratoga Performing Arts Center, picnic areas, hiking trails, and numerous mineral springs.

A portion of northwestern Saratoga County lies within the boundaries of the Adirondack Park and includes Hadley Mountain.

Education

Unified school districts
 Ballston Spa School District
 Burnt Hills-Ballston Lake Central School District
 Corinth Central School District
 Edinburg Common School District
 Galway Central School District
 Hadley-Luzerne Central School
 Mechanicville City School District
 Saratoga Springs City School District
 Schuylerville Central School District
 Shenendehowa Central School District
 South Glens Falls Central School District
 Stillwater Central School District
 Waterford-Halfmoon Union Free School District

Colleges and universities
 Bryant & Stratton College
 Skidmore College
 SUNY Empire State College

Communities

Cities
 Mechanicville
 Saratoga Springs

Towns

 Ballston
 Charlton
 Clifton Park
 Corinth
 Day
 Edinburg
 Galway
 Greenfield
 Hadley
 Halfmoon
 Malta
 Milton
 Moreau
 Northumberland
 Providence
 Saratoga
 Stillwater
 Waterford
 Wilton

Villages

 Ballston Spa (county seat)
 Corinth
 Galway
 Round Lake
 Schuylerville
 South Glens Falls
 Stillwater
 Victory
 Waterford

Census-designated places
 Clifton Gardens
 Clifton Knolls-Mill Creek
 Country Knolls
 Hadley
 Milton
 North Ballston Spa

Hamlets

 Bloodville
 Burnt Hills
 Crescent
 Gansevoort
 Greenfield Center
 Jonesville
 Middle Grove
 Porter Corners
 Quaker Springs
 Rexford
 Rock City Falls
 Vischer Ferry
 West Milton

Government

Saratoga County is governed by a Board Of Supervisors, with each town Supervisor acting as the representative from that community. The City of Saratoga Springs elects two Supervisors and the City of Mechanicville elects one supervisor to sit on the Board of Supervisors, but have no power in their respective city governments. The Town of Clifton Park also elects two Supervisors, one being the elected Town Supervisor, and one having only County duties.  Voting is by weighted vote of each of the communities based on population, which is the reason why Saratoga Springs and Clifton Park, the two largest communities in Saratoga County, elect two Supervisors.  The political makeup of the 2016-17 Board consists of 21 Republicans, and two Democrats.  By long-standing tradition, whoever serves as Chairman of the Board of Supervisor's powerful Law and Finance Committee one year serves as Chairman of the full Board the following year—a tradition that has been broken only three times in Saratoga County's history.  Under this custom, current Law and Finance Committee Chairman Arthur "Mo" Wright, the Supervisor of the Town of Hadley, is slated to become Chairman of the full Board in 2016.

Republicans hold the county-wide offices of Sheriff, District Attorney, County Clerk, Treasurer, and Judges of the County, Family, and the Surrogate Courts.

On the presidential level, like most of the Hudson Valley, Saratoga County was historically powerfully Republican. It only supported a Democrat for president twice in the 20th century, in 1964 and 1996. As a measure of how Republican the county was, it rejected Franklin D. Roosevelt in all four of his successful bids for the White House; Roosevelt did no better than 42.7 percent in the county.

The Republican edge narrowed somewhat in the 1990s, and since then Saratoga County has been a Republican-leaning swing county. George W. Bush won the county narrowly in 2004 with 53% of the vote, while Barack Obama slightly edged out John McCain and Mitt Romney in both 2008 and 2012, becoming the first Democrat to win a majority in the county since 1964. In 2016, Saratoga County flipped back to the Republicans, with Donald Trump capturing a narrow plurality of the vote over Hillary Clinton. This flip proved temporary, with Democratic candidate Joe Biden winning the county in 2020. Saratoga County has backed the winning candidate in every presidential election since 1996.

The county is represented in the U.S. Congress by Republican Elise Stefanik and Democrat Paul Tonko.

In the State Senate, the county is divided between Republicans Daphne Jordan and Jim Tedisco, while in the State Assembly Democrats John T. McDonald III and Carrie Woerner, along with Republicans Mary Beth Walsh and Dan Stec, each represent portions of the county.

James A. Murphy III, a Republican, is the County Court Judge and a former District Attorney.

James A. Bowen had been the dean of NYS Sheriffs, having served as Sheriff since 1972, when he was appointed by Governor Nelson A. Rockefeller.  Bowen won election in his own right in 1973 and had been elected every four years up until his retirement at the end of his tenth term in office in 2013.  Michael H. Zurlo is the current Sheriff, winning the election to succeed Bowen in 2013.

Democratic strength is best shown in the City of Saratoga Springs, which has voted Democratic in every presidential election since 1988. Republican strength is concentrated in the western part of the county, which is mostly rural or exurban. In 2005, the Democrats gained a majority on the Saratoga Springs City Council after decades of Republican dominance.  The Republicans, however, reclaimed the council majority in the 2007 General Elections due to a split Democratic Party in the mayor's race.  In 2009, the Republicans reclaimed their supermajority (4-1) on the City Council, by winning every contested election  (Mayor, Finance, Public Safety, and Public Works). In 2011, Democrats reclaimed the Majority on the City Council, while Republican Scott Johnson was reelected as Mayor.  The Current City Council (2016-2017)is 4-1 Democratic led by Mayor Meg Kelly. At the Saratoga County Board of Supervisors, the City is split, with one Republican and one Democrat holding the two Supervisor seats.

State Assembly
 John McDonald, Democratic, 108th District
 Mary Beth Walsh, Republican, 112th District
 Carrie Woerner, Democratic, 113th District
 Dan Stec, Republican, 114th District

State Senate
 Daphne Jordan, Republican, 43rd District
 Jim Tedisco, Republican, 49th District

United States House of Representatives
 Paul Tonko, Democratic, 20th District
 Elise Stefanik, Republican, 21st District

Notable people
 David Hyde Pierce - actor
 Dottie Pepper - professional golfer
 Scott Underwood -  drummer - Member of Train
 Justin Morrow - figure skater - 2-time U.S. Figure Skating national ice dancing medalist
 Scott Valentine - actor - Best known for his role on "Family Ties"
 Monty Woolley - stage and screen actor - Best known for his role in "The Man Who Came to Dinner"
 Chauney Olcott - actor, songwriter, and singer - Best known for writing "My Wild Irish Rose"
 Kevin Huerter - professional basketball player for the Sacramento Kings

See also

 List of counties in New York
 National Register of Historic Places listings in Saratoga County, New York

Notes

References

Further reading

External links

 Saratoga County, New York site
 
 History of Saratoga County
 Saratoga County Local Histories and Biographies
 Brookside Museum, Saratoga County Historical Society
 Saratoga County history links and information

 
1791 establishments in New York (state)
Populated places established in 1791
New York placenames of Native American origin